Charles Arthur Holloway has been a professor at Stanford University's Graduate School of Business since 1968 and has been a member of SRI International's board of directors since 2003.

In 1990, he founded the Alliance for Innovative Manufacturing at Stanford. He is also a co-founder of the Stanford Center for Entrepreneurial Studies and serves on the boards of Annuity Systems, Freedom Financial Corporation, Lexy, Neato Robots and Occam.

References

Living people
Directors of SRI International
Stanford University Graduate School of Business faculty
University of California, Los Angeles alumni
University of California, Berkeley alumni
Year of birth missing (living people)